The 2014–15 SIU Edwardsville Cougars men's basketball team represented Southern Illinois University Edwardsville during the 2014–15 NCAA Division I men's basketball season. The Cougars, led by eighth year head coach Lennox Forrester, played their home games at the Vadalabene Center as members of the West Division of the Ohio Valley Conference. They finished the season 12–16, 8–8 in OVC play to finish in fourth place in the West Division. They lost in the first round of the OVC tournament to Eastern Illinois.

Preseason
Seven players, all of whom saw major playing time, returned from the 11–20 team of 2013–14. They were joined by two highly regarded junior college transfers and three freshmen. Two of the freshmen were honorable mention All-State players in Illinois and Indiana, and one of the juco transfers was one of the NJCAA statistical leaders in both rebounds and blocked shots.

After being one of only six Division I teams with no freshmen in 2013–14, this year's Cougars had three freshmen, four juniors, and five seniors. The other five schools with no freshmen last season--- UAB, Ohio, Portland State, Savannah State, and Valparaiso.

In putting the schedule together, coach Forrester attempted to get as many games as possible near the hometowns of his players, resulting in road games in Oregon, Michigan, and Indiana.

In the preseason poll of OVC coaches and sports information directors, SIUE was picked to finish third in the West Division. No Cougars were picked for the preseason All-OVC team.

For the third season in a row, the Cougars begin with a preseason exhibition game versus the Division III Greenville College Panthers. In place of a second exhibition game, the Cougars and the UMKC Kangaroos played a closed scrimmage at the VC.

Season

Almost all home and Ohio Valley Conference games were streamed live on the  OVC Digital Network. Other games were broadcast or cablecast and are included on the schedule, below, including nine games FOX Sports carried on its Midwest network.

The Cougars were dominant at the Vadalabene Center, building a home record of 11–3. Going on the road was another story, as they managed only one win in 13 away games. Overall, one result was a record of 8–8 in the OVC, earning the #7 seed in the conference tournament.

No Cougars were named to the OVC All-OVC or All-Newcomer teams.

Postseason
Six days after the first round loss in the Ohio Valley Tournament, it was announced that head coach Lennox Forrester and his entire staff would not be retained.

Roster
Source= 

Pink background indicates players returning from 2013–14.

Schedule
Source: 

|-
!colspan=9 style="background:#CC0000; color:black;"| Exhibition

|-
!colspan=9 style="background:#CC0000; color:black;"| Regular season

|-
!colspan=9 style="background:#CC0000; color:black;"| Ohio Valley Conference tournament

References 

SIU Edwardsville
SIU Edwardsville Cougars men's basketball seasons
Edward
Edward